Kindai may refer to:

 Kindai, Tanzania, an administrative ward
 Kindai High School, Higashiosaka, Osaka, Japan
 Kindai University, Osaka, Japan
 Kanazawa University, called Kindai as an abbreviation, Kanazawa, Japan

See also
 Kinda (disambiguation)
 Kindi (disambiguation)